The Elderly is a 2022 Spanish elderly-themed horror film directed by Raúl Cerezo and Fernando González Gómez which stars Zorion Eguileor, Gustavo Salmerón, Paula Gallego, and Irene Anula.

Plot 
Set in Madrid during a heat wave, the plot follows the strange behaviour displayed by elderly people, focusing on the deterioration of octogenarian Manuel in the wake of his wife Rosa's suicide and the actions of Manuel's family (son Mario, daughter-in-law Lena, and granddaughter Naia), otherwise at odds vis-à-vis the prospect of welcoming him.

Cast

Production 
The screenplay was penned by Raúl Cerezo, Javier Trigales, and Rubén Sánchez Trigos. A Person's Films, La Dalia Films and Antídoto Films production, the film had the collaboration of Gobierno de Navarra and Navarra Film Commission and support from Ayuntamiento de Madrid. Shooting locations included Madrid and Navarre.

Release 

The film made its world premiere at the Montreal-based Fantasia International Film Festival on 16 July 2022. It was set to have its US premiere at the Austin-based Fantastic Fest in September 2022. It was set to land its European premiere at the 55th Sitges Film Festival in October 2022.

Reception 
Andrew Mack of ScreenAnarchy described the film as a "mysteriously wicked horror that starts off as a tale of supernatural residency and influence on our grandparents", with "all hell" breaking loose in a "breathtaking 15 minute finale".

Meagan Navarro of Bloody Disgusting assessed that "the intense finale cannot compensate for the sluggish and overly mysterious build-up", with the helmers favouring prolonged ambiguity throughout the bulk of the film over anything else.

Nick Allen of RogerEbert.com assessed the film to be "imbalanced", with its visual compositions being "so striking throughout", but "its plotting trades the ominous for obvious".

Sharai Bohannon of Dread Central rated the film 4½ out of 5 stars, deeming it to be a "disturbingly deadly chaotic ride", a "gorgeous movie, with just the right amount of creepiness, tension, and drama".

See also 
 List of Spanish films of 2022

References 

2022 horror films
Spanish horror films
Films shot in Madrid
Films shot in Navarre
Films set in Madrid
2020s Spanish-language films
Films about old age
2020s Spanish films